Goldfish is an oil-on-canvas still life painting by French visual artist Henri Matisse. Painted in 1912, Goldfish was part of a series that Matisse produced between the spring and early summer of 1912.

Background
In the early 1900s, Matisse established himself as a leader of the Fauvism art movement. Fauvism emphasised a strong use of color and painterly qualities, as opposed to realistic representations found in Impressionist art. In 1912, Matisse visited Tangier, Morocco, where he noted how the locals would be fascinated by goldfish swimming in bowls. 

Shortly after his visit to Morocco, Matisse produced a series of paintings that included Goldfish between the spring and early summer. Goldfish was painted in Matisse's garden conservatory at his home in Issy-les-Moulineaux. He moved there to escape the pressures of Paris.

Description and composition
The 1912 Goldfish painting was unlike other Matisse works featuring goldfish, as the goldfish themselves are the focus of the piece. Matisse continued the use of bright colours found in his Fauvist work on Goldfish. The painting features a "bright orange [that] strongly contrasts with the more subtle pinks and greens that surround the fish bowl and the blue-green background."

A still life, the painting features "Matisse's own plants, his own garden furniture, and his own fish tank." Additionally, Matisse's "depiction of space" in the piece creates a tension. The goldfish can be seen from two different angles simultaneously: from the front, where the viewer can immediately recognise them, and from above, where they are "merely suggested by colorful brushstrokes."

Themes and analysis
Smarthistory wrote that Goldfish is "an illustration of some of the major themes in Matisse's painting: his use of complementary colors, his quest for an idyllic paradise, his appeal for contemplative relaxation for the viewer and his complex construction of pictorial space."

Provenance and legacy
The motif of fish in aquariums was notable in his work and would become a recurring sight from in the early and mid-1910s.

The piece was purchased by Sergei Shchukin in Paris from Matisse's studio in 1912, and was a part of Shchukin's Pink Drawing Room ensemble in his home. Since 1948, the work has been located at the Pushkin Museum in Moscow, Russia. Goldfish holds the distinction of being the featured Matisse work found in the College Board's AP Art History curriculum.

References

1912 paintings
Fish in art
Goldfish in culture
Oil on canvas paintings
Paintings by Henri Matisse
Paintings in the collection of the Pushkin Museum
Post-impressionist paintings
Still life paintings